The Première ligue de soccer du Québec (PLSQ) is a semi-professional soccer league created in 2012. The Quebec Soccer Federation operates both men's and women's divisions at the pro-am tier of the Canadian soccer league system. The league is part of League1 Canada, the national third tier divided into regional divisions, with the PLSQ equivalent to League1 Ontario and League1 British Columbia. The men's league winner qualifies for the Canadian Championship, the national cup championship, for the following season.

History
The history of soccer in Quebec dates back to 1884, with the first league established in 1886. In 1911, the Province of Quebec Football Association, now known as the Quebec Soccer Federation was founded. In 1986, a semi-professional league called the Ligue nationale de soccer du Québec (LNSQ) was created, but it merged with different rival leagues to form the Ligue de soccer élite du Québec in 1992. In 1993, five of the former LNSQ clubs Corfinium St-Leonard, Cosmos de LaSalle, Luso Stars Mont-Royal, Montreal Croatia, and Montreal Ramblers joined the Canadian National Soccer League (CNSL) to form the league's Eastern Division. Following this, the amateur Ligue de soccer élite du Québec served as the top level of soccer in the province, although Quebec clubs did play in the United Soccer League (Montreal Impact) and the semi-professional Canadian Soccer League (Laval Dynamites/Trois-Rivières Attak and Montreal Impact Academy).

In 2011, the PLSQ was established, marking the return of a semi-professional soccer league to the province for the first time in 20 years. The league was sanctioned by the Canadian Soccer Association as a level 3 league, below Major League Soccer (level 1) and the North American Soccer League and United Soccer League (level 2), which were American-based fully professional leagues featuring some Canadian teams, including the Montreal Impact of the MLS.

The PLSQ had its debut season in 2012 with a male division featuring 5 teams – A.S. Blainville, FC Brossard, FC Boisbriand, FC L'Assomption, and FC Saint-Léonard. FC Saint-Léonard won the inaugural season. The following season, the league added a League Cup to its schedule, the Coupe PLSQ, which would take place annually at the conclusion of the season, unrelated to the results of the regular season.  In 2014, the province of Ontario created its own semi-professional level 3 league, League1 Ontario, and the Inter-Provincial Cup was established which would be contested between the champions of each league and ran for three years until 2016. In 2015, the league added its first club from outside of the province of Quebec, with the Ottawa Fury FC Academy joining the league. Beginning in 2018, the league champion qualified to participate in the Canadian Championship for the following season.  In 2018, a women's division was added, starting with five teams. The start of the 2020 season was delayed due to the COVID-19 pandemic, but it ultimately resumed with a shortened season, although some teams did opt out of playing for the season.  However, the remainder of the male season was cancelled about three-quarters of the way through the season, due to a resurgence of the pandemic (the female season had already concluded).

Over the course of its history, various clubs have joined and departed the league. A.S. Blainville is the only club to have participated in every season since the league's inception. Blainville has been the most successful club, winning the league championship four times and the league cup twice and CS Mont-Royal Outremont has been second-most successful with four league championships and one league cup title.

Format
Depending on the number of teams in the league, teams will play every other team between 2-4 times per season, for a length of usually between 15 and 20 games. The winner gets the regular season championship. At the end of the year, there is a League Cup, called the Coupe PLSQ, which began in 2013. The format varies each season, depending on the number of teams in the league.  The most recent Cup competition featured nine teams, where three groups of three teams were formed. The winner of each group along with the best second-place finisher advanced to the semi-finals.

Each team has a minimum of nine paid players and is subject to a salary cap.

Men's Division

Current clubs
The following twelve teams are members of the league for the 2022 season:

Former clubs

Timeline

Women's Division

Current clubs
The following twelve teams are members of the league for the 2022 season:

Former clubs

Timeline

Players who earned national team caps while in the PLSQ
The following players have earned a senior national team cap while playing in the PLSQ (the year of their first cap while playing in the league is listed). Players who earned caps before or after playing in the PLSQ are not included.

Men

Women

See also

 Canadian soccer league system
 League1 Canada
 League1 Alberta
 League1 British Columbia
 League1 Ontario
 United Soccer League
 USL League Two

Notes

References

External links
 

 
Soccer leagues in Canada
Soccer leagues in Quebec
Canada
Sports leagues established in 2012
2012 establishments in Quebec
Professional sports leagues in Canada
League1 Canada